Vesletind Peak is a small peak 3 nautical miles (6 km) east-southeast of Aurho Peak on the Ahlmann Ridge in Queen Maud Land. It was mapped by Norwegian cartographers from surveys and air photos by Norwegian-British-Swedish Antarctic Expedition (NBSAE) (1949–52) and named Vesletind, meaning "little peak."

Mountains of Queen Maud Land
Princess Martha Coast